Francis Hely-Hutchinson (26 October 1759 – 16 December 1827), styled The Honourable from 1783, was an Irish politician.

Biography
He was the son of Christiana Nickson, 1st Baroness of Donoughmore of Knocklofty and The Rt Hon. John Hely-Hutchinson.  He served as Member of Parliament in the Irish House of Commons for Dublin University from 1790 to 1798 and then for Naas from 1798 until the Act of Union in 1801.

He married Frances Nixon and had nine children. Their daughter, Louisa Frances Hely-Hutchinson married Francis Synge-Hutchinson and their son was Lt-Gen Coote Synge-Hutchinson. His son John succeeded to the peerages created for both his mother and brother.

From 1800-27 he served as Collector of Customs at Dublin Port succeeding Theophilus Jones.

References

1769 births
1827 deaths
Irish MPs 1790–1797
Irish MPs 1798–1800
Members of the Parliament of Ireland (pre-1801) for Dublin University
Younger sons of barons
Francis
Members of the Parliament of Ireland (pre-1801) for County Kildare constituencies